The Swedish ice hockey junior championship is a club championship contested in three age groups (20 years and younger, 18 years and younger and 16 years and younger) awarded annually to the winning playoff team of respective league or cup, the J20 SuperElit, the J18 Allsvenskan, and the U16 Swedish Championship.

The champion of the oldest age group wins the Anton Cup. Frölunda HC has won the most championships in the oldest age group, Leksands IF the most in the middle age group and Djurgårdens IF the most in the youngest age group.

20 years and younger (J20)

Previous winners

Title champions

18 years and younger (J18)

Previous winners

Title champions

16 years and younger (U16)

Previous winners

Title champions

See also
List of Swedish ice hockey champions

References
SM för J20 sedan 1957
SM för U18 sedan starten 1980
SM för U16 sedan starten 1972

Champions
Junior ice hockey in Sweden